Yakov (alternative spellings: Jakov or Iakov) is a Russian or Hebrew variant of the given names Jacob and James. People also give the nickname Yasha or Yashka used for Yakov.

Notable people
People named Yakov

 Yakov Blumkin (1900–1929), a Left Socialist-Revolutionary
 Yakov Cherevichenko (1894–1976), Soviet military leader
 Yakov Chubin (1893–1956), Soviet official
 Yakov Dzhugashvili (1907–1943), the oldest son of Joseph Stalin
 Yakov Eliashberg (born 1946), American mathematician
 Yakov Ehrlich (born 1988), former Russian football player
 Yakov Eshpay (1890–1963), Soviet composer
 Yakov Estrin (1923–1987), Soviet chess player
 Yakov Fedorenko (1896–1947), Soviet military leader
 Yakov Frenkel (1894–1952), Soviet physicist
 Yakov Fliyer (1912–1977), Soviet pianist
 Yakov Gakkel (1901–1965), Soviet oceanographer
 Yakov "Yan" Gamarnik (1894–1937), Soviet official
 Yakov Grot (1812–1893), Russian philologist
 Yakov Kazyansky (born 1948), Russian musician
 Yakov Knyazhnin (1740/42–1791), Russian playwright
 Yakov Kozalchik, Polish strongman and professional wrestler who was also known as Shimshon Eisen
 Yakov Kreizberg (1959–2011), American conductor
 Yakov Kreizer (1905–1969), Soviet military leader
 Yakov Kulnev (1763–1812), Russian military leader
 Yakov Malik (1906–1980), Soviet diplomat
 Yakov Malkiel (1914–1998), American philologist
 Yakov I. Perelman (1882–1942), Soviet writer
 Yakov Permyakov (?–1712), Russian polar explorer
 Yakov Peters (1886–1938), Soviet official
 Yakov Polonsky (1819–1898), Russian poet
 Yakov Popok (1892–1938), Soviet official
 Yakov Protazanov (1881–1945), Russian and Soviet filmmaker
 Yakov Punkin, Soviet Olympic Greco-Roman featherweight wrestling champion
 Yakov Rylsky, Soviet Olympic and world champion saber fencer
 Yakov Sannikov, Russian merchant and explorer
 Yakov Shakhovskoy, Russian statesman
 Yakov G. Sinai
 Yakov Smirnoff, Ukrainian-born American comedian, painter and teacher
 Yakov Springer
 Yakov Sverdlov, Bolshevik party leader and official of the Russian Soviet Republic
 Yakov Tolstikov, Russian distance runner
 Yakov-Yan Toumarkin (born 1992), Israeli swimmer
 Yakov Vilner, Ukrainian chess master
 Yakov Yurovsky, Old Bolshevik activist
 Yakov Zak, Soviet pianist and teacher
 Yakov Borisovich Zel'dovich, Soviet physicist

See also
Jakov
Yakovlev (surname)
Yakovenko

Hebrew masculine given names
Russian masculine given names